Ahmat Brahim (born 8 December 1982) was a Chadian football midfielder. He last played for Elect-Sport FC.

Career
He played most of his career for Chadian club Renaissance FC. He finished his career in Elect-Sport FC.

International goals
Scores and results list Chad's goal tally first.

See also
 List of Chad international footballers

References

External links
 Statistics at FIFA

1982 births
Living people
Chadian footballers
Chad international footballers
Place of birth missing (living people)

Association football midfielders